Willis (Lee) Stetson was the Dean of Undergraduate Admissions at the University of Pennsylvania for 29 years.

University of Pennsylvania
Stetson worked as Dean of Undergraduate Admissions at the University of Pennsylvania for 29 years until 2007. According to former Union College admissions dean Daniel M. Lundquist, he brought "modern college recruiting practices to the Ivy League", and he was known as an advocate of early admission policies which, he argued, attracted a more dedicated cadre of students. In September 2007, Stetson announced his retirement.

References

External links
Wharton School of the University of Pennsylvania profile
Transcript of Feb 2000 radio appearance discussing admissions
Profile on IvyWise website
Interview with University Business

University of Pennsylvania faculty
Living people
Year of birth missing (living people)
American academic administrators